The Collection is a compilation album by Spandau Ballet. It was released in 1997 by EMI.

In 2001 it was reissued by the Dutch reissue label Disky.

Track listing

References

1999 compilation albums
Spandau Ballet albums